Chayce Beckham (born July 16, 1996) is a singer-songwriter from Apple Valley, California, who rose to fame after winning the nineteenth season of the singing reality show American Idol.

Early life
Beckham was born in Victorville to Windie Petersen and spent his childhood in Victorville,  Hesperia, and Apple Valley, California. He went to Carmel Elementary School in Hesperia, Vanguard Preparatory School and Sitting Bull Academy in Apple Valley, before moving to Glendora High School at the age of 12, and continuing at Whitcomb High School, where he graduated in 2014.  He worked as a heavy machinery operator and formed a reggae band called the Sinking Sailors when he was 19 or 20. He cited Jim Morrison, Bob Marley, Bob Dylan, Johnny Cash, Waylon Jennings, Hank Williams Jr., and Hank Williams Sr. as his musical influences, In late 2020, two weeks before he auditioned for American Idol, he was involved in a near-fatal car wreck.

American Idol
Beckham auditioned for the nineteenth season of the singing reality show American Idol in Los Angeles, California. After surviving Hollywood Week and making it into the Top 5, Beckham received the most votes to win, and on May 23, 2021, he was crowned the winner of the nineteenth season of American Idol, beating runner-up Willie Spence.

On American Idol, he performed "23", which he wrote a year prior, and the song reached No. 1 on the iTunes chart after he performed the song. The song was released as his single. The song made him the first Idol winner to do so with an original song.

Discography

Extended plays

Singles

References

External links 
 Chayce Beckham and Beyonce are included in historical points of interest for the town of Apple Valley

American Idol winners
Living people
Hollywood Records artists
21st-century American male singers
21st-century American singers
1996 births